Melisomimas metallica is a moth in the family Cossidae, and the only species in the genus Melisomimas. It is found in Nigeria and Sierra Leone.

References

Natural History Museum Lepidoptera generic names catalog

Metarbelinae
Moths described in 1914